Mark Montreuil (born December 29, 1971) is a Canadian retired professional American football defensive back. He played three seasons for the San Diego Chargers of the National Football League after being drafted 237th overall in the 1995 NFL Draft. He played college football for Concordia University.

Montreuil was born in Montreal, Quebec.

External links

1971 births
Canadian players of American football
Living people
San Diego Chargers players
Sportspeople from Montreal
20th-century Canadian people